Sun Creature Studio is a Danish animation studio. It was founded in 2014 when the creators launched a Kickstarter campaign to fund the production of the animated series The Reward: Tales of Alethrion. In 2016 it collaborated with fellow Danish production company Final Cut for Real to produce Flee, an animated documentary film about a young Afghan refugee in Denmark. 

It later produced three advertisements for Travel Oregon called "Only Slightly Exaggerated" (2018), "Only Slightly (More) Exaggerated" (2019), and ""Still Only Slightly Exaggerated" (2021), all of which included Oregon landscapes animated in the style of Hayao Miyazaki. As of 2019 Sun Creature has been added to the talent roster of Blacklist, a production company owned by Psyop. 

In 2019, Sun Creature Studios produced the animation for an episode of the Netflix animated anthology series "Love, Death & Robots." The episode is called "Alternate Histories." It is included in Volume 1 of the series.

References 

Danish animation studios
Danish film studios